Michael Mansfield  (born 12 October 1941) is an English barrister and head of chambers at Nexus Chambers. He was recently described as "The king of human rights work" by The Legal 500 and as a leading Silk in civil liberties and human rights (including actions against the police).

A British republican, vegetarian, socialist and self-described "radical lawyer", he has participated in prominent and controversial court cases and inquests involving accused IRA bombers, the Birmingham Six, Bloody Sunday massacre, the Hillsborough disaster and the deaths of Jean Charles de Menezes and Princess Diana and the McLibel case.

Early life 
Mansfield grew up in north Finchley, North London, and attended Holmewood Preparatory School (Woodside Park) before going to Highgate School and the University of Keele, where he graduated with a BA (Hons) in history and philosophy, and was Secretary of Keele's Students' Union.

Career
Mansfield was called to the bar at Gray's Inn in 1967, became Queen's Counsel in 1989 and was elected as a Bencher of Gray's Inn in 2007.

He is currently the president of the Haldane Society of Socialist Lawyers, and is a professor of law at City University. Mansfield is an after-dinner and keynote speaker.

Notable cases

As well as representing those wrongly convicted of the IRA's Guildford and Birmingham pub bombings, Mansfield has represented: the Angry Brigade; Dolours and Marian Price; Brian Keenan; the Orgreave miners; Mahmood Hussein Mattan, Ruth Ellis and James Hanratty (in posthumous appeals); those involved in the Israeli Embassy bombing; Frank Crichlow, owner of the Mangrove restaurant; Stephen Lawrence's family; Michael Barrymore at the Stuart Lubbock inquest; Barry George at the inquest into the death of Jill Dando; the gangster Kenneth Noye; the Bloody Sunday families; Arthur Scargill; Angela Cannings; Fatmir Limaj, a Kosovo-Albanian leader prosecuted in the Hague; Mohamed al-Fayed in the inquest into the deaths of his son Dodi al-Fayed and Diana, Princess of Wales; and the families of Jean Charles de Menezes and Mark Duggan.

In March 2019 Mansfield was engaged by the family of footballer Emiliano Sala to represent their interests in the dispute over his death. Mansfield has been referred to as a "champagne socialist" though he has said that 95 per cent of his work comes from legal aid.

Lockerbie bombing
Warning against over-reliance upon forensic science to secure convictions, Mansfield in the BBC Scotland Frontline Scotland TV programme "Silence over Lockerbie", broadcast on 14 October 1997, said he wanted to make just one point:
Forensic science is not immutable. They're not written in tablets of stone, and the biggest mistake that anyone can make—public, expert or anyone else alike—is to believe that forensic science is somehow beyond reproach: it is not! The biggest miscarriages of justice in the United Kingdom, many of them emanate from cases in which forensic science has been shown to be wrong. And the moment a forensic scientist or anyone else says: 'I am sure this marries up with that' I get worried.

Personal life
Mansfield has been married three times. He was married for 19 years to Melian Bordes, with whom he had five children (Jonathan, Anna, Louise, Leo and Kieran), and for 30 years to the artist/filmmaker Yvette Vanson, from whom he separated in 2014 and with whom he had a son (Fred). He has been with his current wife, Yvette Greenway, a well-known snooker player, since 2015. His daughter, Anna, took her own life in May 2015.

Political views
In November 2019, along with other public figures, Mansfield signed a letter supporting Labour Party leader Jeremy Corbyn, describing him as "a beacon of hope in the struggle against emergent far-right nationalism, xenophobia and racism in much of the democratic world", and endorsed Corbyn in the 2019 UK general election.

In December 2019, along with 42 other leading cultural figures, he signed a letter endorsing the Labour Party under Jeremy Corbyn's leadership in the 2019 general election. The letter stated that "Labour's election manifesto under Corbyn's leadership offers a transformative plan that prioritises the needs of people and the planet over private profit and the vested interests of a few."

Charity work
Mansfield is a patron of the animal rights organisation Viva! (Vegetarians International Voice for Animals) and refers to animal production as "genocide". He is also patron of Hastings Advice and Representation Centre, a charity providing free welfare benefit advice and representation for local people in Hastings, East Sussex and the surrounding area. He is a co-founder and trustee of the charity Silence of Suicide (SOS).

He is an environmental and animal rights activist and has recently stated that meat may become banned in the future, and there should be a law made to criminalise ecocide, or destruction of the environment as a result of intensive animal agriculture.

See also 
Hans Köchler's Lockerbie trial observer mission
Pan Am Flight 103 bombing trial
University of Cambridge Chancellor election, 2011

References

Further reading 
 Who's Who, 2006
 Michael Mansfield, Memoirs of a Radical Lawyer. London, Bloomsbury. 2009.

External links 
 Nexus, the Chambers of Michael Mansfield QC Michael Mansfield's Chambers

1941 births
Living people
People from Finchley
People educated at Highgate School
Alumni of Keele University
English lawyers
Members of Gray's Inn
English barristers
British King's Counsel
British republicans
English animal rights activists
English environmentalists
English human rights activists
English legal professionals
English legal writers
English socialists
Human rights lawyers